The Radical Peasant Party (CSR) was a political party in Poland.

History
The party was established in 1919, with the radical priest Eugeniusz Okoń and Tomasz Dąbal amongst its founders. It received around 1% of the vote in the 1922 elections, winning four seats in the Sejm. However, two MPs left to join the new Peasant Party in 1926.

The 1928 elections saw the CSR's vote share fall to 0.4%, and it lost all its seats in the Sejm. It ceased to exist the following year.

References

1919 establishments in Poland
1929 disestablishments in Poland
Agrarian parties in Poland
Defunct political parties in Poland
Political parties disestablished in 1929
Political parties established in 1919